Macaduma reducta is a moth in the subfamily Arctiinae. It was described by Walter Rothschild in 1912. It is found on Fergusson Island in Papua New Guinea.

References

Macaduma
Moths described in 1912